Tee Pee Records is an American independent rock music record label in New York City, prominent for releasing music by Sleep, Witch, Graveyard, Earthless, High on Fire and the Brian Jonestown Massacre. It has housed many stoner rock bands.

Roster

Current artists

Ancestors
Assemble Head in Sunburst Sound
Burning Love
Carousel
Coliseum
Earthless
Graveyard
Hopewell
Imaad Wasif
Jason Simon of Dead Meadow
Joy
Karma to Burn
Naam
Nebula
Night Horse
Quest for Fire
Ruby the Hatchet
The Skull
Spindrift
The Warlocks
Whirr
Witch

Past artists

All Night
Annihilation Time
Bad Wizard
Black NASA
Boulder
The Brian Jonestown Massacre
Buzzkill
Chrome Locust
Cloudland Canyon
Core
Mark D
Drunk Horse
Eldopa
Entrance
The Everyones
Gonga
Hermano
High on Fire
The High Strung
Immortal Lee County Killers
The J.J. Paradise Players Club
Kadavar
Kalas
Kreisor
Leechmilk
Logical Nonsense
Lost Goat
The Lovetones
Maplewood
The Mystick Krewe of Clearlight
On Trial
Pay Neuter
Priestess
Raging Slab
Sixty Watt Shaman
Sleep
Sofa King Killer
Spirit Caravan
Teeth of the Hydra
Throttle
Titan
Tricky Woo
Ya Ho Wha 13

References

External links
 Official site
 Myspace

Record labels established in 1993
1993 establishments in New York City
Companies based in New York City
American independent record labels
Rock record labels
Heavy metal record labels
Psychedelic rock record labels